Souren Choudhury (born 25 July 1918) was an Indian sports shooter. He competed in the 50 m rifle, prone event at the 1952 Summer Olympics.

References

External links
 

1918 births
Possibly living people
Sportspeople from Kolkata
Indian male sport shooters
Olympic shooters of India
Shooters at the 1952 Summer Olympics
Place of birth missing